is a railway station of Kyushu Railway Company located in Uto, Kumamoto Prefecture, Japan. At this station the Misumi Line branches off the Kagoshima Main Line.

The station opened on January 28, 1895.

References 
 

Railway stations in Kumamoto Prefecture
Railway stations in Japan opened in 1895